The 2018–19 Hofstra Pride men's basketball team represented Hofstra University during the 2018–19 NCAA Division I men's basketball season. The Pride, led by sixth-year head coach Joe Mihalich, played their home games at Mack Sports Complex in Hempstead, New York as members of the Colonial Athletic Association. Hofstra won the CAA regular season championship but lost to Northeastern in the championship game of the 2019 CAA men's basketball tournament. Their regular season championship earned them an automatic berth to the 2019 National Invitational Tournament, where they lost to NC State.

Previous season
The Pride finished the 2017–18 season 19–12, 12–6 in CAA play to finish in third place. They lost in the first round of the CAA tournament to UNC Wilmington.

Offseason

Departures

Incoming transfers

Under NCAA transfer rules, Kante will have to sit out for the 2018–19 season. Will have three years of remaining eligibility.

2018 recruiting class

Roster

Schedule and results

|-
!colspan=12 style=| Non-conference regular season

|-
!colspan=12 style=| CAA regular season

|-
!colspan=12 style=| CAA tournament

|-
!colspan=12 style=| NIT

Source

Rankings

*AP does not release post-NCAA Tournament rankings

See also
2018–19 Hofstra Pride women's basketball team

References

Hofstra Pride men's basketball seasons
Hofstra
Hofstra